Stanley Cook Norton (19 November 1894 – 4 April 1978), was an American naval officer who served during World War II and reached the rank of Rear Admiral in the United States Navy.

Early life and education
Stanley Cook Norton was born November 19, 1894 in Falmouth, Maine to Frank K. and Flora Norton (née Cook).

Military career
In 1914 he was accepted to the United States Naval Academy as a midshipman. While at the academy, Norton participated both football and basketball. "On March 4, 1917, the U.S. Congress authorized the academy to reduce its four-year program to graduating and to commissioning new Navy and Marine Corps officers in three years." Because of this authorisation, Norton and the rest of the class of 1918 graduated June 28, 1917.

Due to the Act of May 22, 1917, he, along with many service men, received a temporary promotion to Lieutenant in June 1918. In 1924, he was assigned to the submarine base at New London; by 1927, he was commanding the gunboat  stationed in Hong Kong. In 1938, he was promoted to Commander and was assigned as a naval reserve instructor in 1939.

Norton was a "brusque, no non-sense commander" known for his command of Destroyer Division 54. For this action, he, and the Ropers captain, were awarded the Navy Cross.

Norton retired from the Navy after 30 years of service in July 1947, whereupon he was "placed, or advanced, upon the retired list to Rear Admiral in recognition of having been specially commended by the Secretary of the Navy or head of another executive department for performance of duty under in actual combat."

Family
Norton's son, Stanley C. Norton Jr., was born while Norton was stationed in Hong Kong and died in 2016.

References

1894 births
1978 deaths
United States Naval Academy alumni
United States Navy rear admirals (upper half)
Military personnel from Maine
Recipients of the Navy Cross (United States)
United States Navy personnel of World War II
20th-century American naval officers